Less than Zero is the original motion picture soundtrack album to Marek Kanievska's 1987 drama film Less than Zero. It was released on November 6, 1987, through Def Jam/Columbia Records, and consisted of a variety of music genres, including hard rock, pop rock, hip hop, heavy metal and contemporary R&B, with most of the album being produced by Rick Rubin. The soundtrack found success, peaking at 31 on the Billboard 200 and 22 on the Top R&B/Hip-Hop Albums, and was certified gold by the Recording Industry Association of America on February 8, 1988.

Four singles made it to the Billboard charts. The Black Flames cover of "Are You My Woman (Tell Me So)" and Public Enemy's "Bring the Noise" were minor hits on the R&B charts, but LL Cool J's "Going Back to Cali" and The Bangles cover of "A Hazy Shade of Winter" fared better, making it to 31 and 2 on the Billboard Hot 100 respectively.

Track listing

Certifications

References

External links

Rock soundtracks
Hip hop soundtracks
1987 soundtrack albums
Drama film soundtracks
Rhythm and blues soundtracks
Albums produced by Rick Rubin
Def Jam Recordings soundtracks